Looking for Lowry with Ian McKellen is a documentary film about the British artist L. S. Lowry and his work. The film is written and directed by Margy Kinmonth and produced by Foxtrot Films Ltd and features Ian McKellen (L. S. Lowry), Noel Gallagher and Dame Paula Rego. Visiting the Tate Modern store to view its Lowry collection the documentary asks why, despite his popular appeal, the Tate does not have any of its 23 Lowrys on show to the public. Lowry’s heiress Carol Lowry (no relation) appears for the first time on film, describing her 19 year friendship with Uncle Laurie. When Lowry died, he left everything to her in his will; the film features her own personal archive which was found in Lowry’s house.

The film sparked controversy. Tate Britain came under fire in the press for not displaying any of its collection of works by L.S. Lowry. The museum subsequently held a major exhibition of Lowry’s landscapes in 2013 entitled "Lowry and the Painting of Modern Life".

The film was the first of ITV’s Perspectives strand on Sunday 24 April 2011.

Credits 
 Contributors
 Ian McKellen
 Carol Ann Lowry
 Noel Gallagher
 Dame Paula Rego
 Gillian Lynne
 Jeffrey Archer
 Ben Timperley
 Andrew Kalman
 Robin Light
 Edwin Mullins
 Jonathon Horwich
 Peter Wroe
 Pam Heywood
 Chris Stephens
 Prof. Michael Fitzgerald
 Darren Goldsmith
 Martha Leebolt
 Helena Clark-Maxwell
 Sally Kalman

References

External links 
 

2011 television films
2011 films
2011 documentary films